In Algerian football, the Algerian Cup Final, the deciding match of the Algerian Cup competition, is considered the highest domestic honour for referees to be appointed to officiate no foreign referee has ever managed the final of the Algerian Cup since independence. the most important referees for the final of the cup are Djamel Haimoudi and Mohamed Hansal four times for each of those who managed the final two consecutive times are Mohamed Benghazel, Mohamed Hansal and Mohamed Bichari and the youngest final referee is Haimoudi in 1998 he was 26 years old.

After independence

1980 to 1999

21st century

Referees with more than one final

Notes

Algerian Cup